Psychology in the Schools is a peer-reviewed academic journal published ten times per year by Wiley-Blackwell. It was established in 1964 and the editor-in-chief is David E. McIntosh (Ball State University). The journal covers school psychology.

According to the Journal Citation Reports, the journal has a 2021 impact factor of 1.923.

References

External links

Wiley-Blackwell academic journals
English-language journals
Publications established in 1964
Educational psychology journals